Nikia Hillarie Deveaux (born September 28, 1985) is a female freestyle swimmer from the Bahamas. She swam for the Bahamas at the 2004 Summer Olympics. At the 2007 Pan American Games she was part of the bronze medal winning women's 4 × 100 m medley relay alongside Alicia Lightbourne, Arianna Vanderpool and Alana Dillette.

See also
Swimming at the 2007 Pan American Games

References
sports-reference

1987 births
Living people
Bahamian female swimmers
Bahamian female freestyle swimmers
Swimmers at the 2004 Summer Olympics
Olympic swimmers of the Bahamas
Swimmers at the 2006 Commonwealth Games
Commonwealth Games competitors for the Bahamas
Swimmers at the 2003 Pan American Games
Swimmers at the 2007 Pan American Games
Pan American Games bronze medalists for the Bahamas
Kentucky Wildcats women's swimmers
Pan American Games medalists in swimming
Medalists at the 2007 Pan American Games